Peter Körte (26 June 1896 – 13 January 1947) was a general in the Wehrmacht of Nazi Germany during World War II. He was a recipient of the Knight's Cross of the Iron Cross.

Awards and decorations

 Knight's Cross of the Iron Cross on 27 July 1943 as Oberst and commander of Füsilier-Regiment 26

Notes

References

1896 births
1947 deaths
Major generals of the German Army (Wehrmacht)
Recipients of the Knight's Cross of the Iron Cross
Military personnel from Berlin